The Table Tennis tournament of the 2006 Lusophony Games was played in Macau, People's Republic of China. The venue was the Macao East Asian Games Dome Theatre. The tournament was played from 9  to 11 October 2006, and there was both the men's and women's competition with singles, doubles, and mixed doubles.

Male Singles

Round robin

Group A

Group B

Group C

Group D

Brackets

Female Singles

Round robin

Group A

Group B

Brackets

Male Doubles

Brackets

Female Doubles

Brackets

Mixed doubles

Brackets

See also
ACOLOP
Lusophony Games
2006 Lusophony Games

References

2006 Lusofonia Games
Table tennis at the Lusofonia Games
2006 in table tennis